Henry Horst (October 15, 1836 – March 4, 1905) was an American farmer and politician.

Born in Germany, Horst emigrated with parents to the United States in 1846 and settled in Pittsburgh, Pennsylvania. In 1850, Horst and his parents moved to the town of Charlestown, Calumet County, Wisconsin. Horst was a farmer. He served on the Charlestown Town Board and was chairman of the town board. Horst also served on the Calumet County Board of Supervisors and was chairman of the county board. In 1876, Horst served in the Wisconsin State Assembly and was a Democrat. Horst died of pneumonia.

Notes

External links

1836 births
1905 deaths
Deaths from pneumonia in Wisconsin
People from Charlestown, Wisconsin
German emigrants to the United States
Farmers from Wisconsin
Wisconsin city council members
Mayors of places in Wisconsin
County supervisors in Wisconsin
19th-century American politicians
Democratic Party members of the Wisconsin State Assembly